is a baseball stadium located in Kurashiki Sports Park, Kurashiki, Okayama Prefecture, Japan. It has a capacity of 30,670. It is an all-seater.

External links 

 Muscat Stadium / Kurashiki Sports Park , official website

Baseball venues in Japan
Sports venues in Okayama Prefecture
Kurashiki